Christian Deutschmann (born 11 February 1988) is an Austrian footballer.

External links
 
 

Austrian footballers
Association football defenders
FC Wacker Innsbruck (2002) players
Floridsdorfer AC players
SC Wiener Neustadt players
DSV Leoben players
Grazer AK players
1988 births
Living people
2. Liga (Austria) players
Austrian Football Bundesliga players